Salix japonica is a species of willow native to hills and mountains of central Honshū, Japan. It is a deciduous shrub, reaching a height of 2 m.

External links

References 

japonica